Novaya (Yañawıl) is a rural locality (a village) in Arslanovsky Selsoviet, Chishminsky District, Bashkortostan, Russia. The population was 358 as of 2010. There are 9 streets.

Geography 
Novaya is located 18 km north of Chishmy (the district's administrative centre) by road. Aminevo is the nearest rural locality.

References 

Rural localities in Chishminsky District